This is a list of football (soccer) clubs in Uruguay.

List of AUF-members clubs

Levels:
 - Uruguayan Primera División
 - Segunda División Profesional
 - Segunda División Amateur

Other clubs
Deportivo Colonia
Frontera Rivera
Huracán Buceo
Paysandú
Paysandú Bella Vista
Quilmes
Salto
Salus
Universidad Mayor

References

External links
(AUF) Asociación Uruguay de Fútbol Official Website
Segunda División Profesional Official Website

Uruguay
 
Clubs
Football clubs